Line Cecilie Verndal (born 23 March 1972) a Norwegian actress, born in Oslo. She has worked in various Norwegian theatres and has the main role of Marit in the Norwegian drama-series Himmelblå.

Filmography

References

External links

1972 births
Living people
Norwegian film actresses
Norwegian television actresses
Norwegian stage actresses
Actresses from Oslo